Sven Gerich (born 30 October 1974 in Hannoversch Münden) is a German politician from Social Democratic Party of Germany (SPD).

Life 
Gerich worked in his father's company in Wiesbaden. He has been mayor of Wiesbaden since 1 July 2013 . On 24 January 2019, he announced that he would not run again in the May 2019 election.
Gerich is married to his partner Helge.

Other activities
 ESWE Versorgungs AG, Ex-Officio Chairman of the Supervisory Board
 Kraftwerke Mainz-Wiesbaden AG, Ex-Officio Chairman of the Supervisory Board

References

External links

 Website by Sven Gerich
 Website by Wiesbaden:Sven Gerich
 Interview in Frankfurter Allgemeinen Zeitung 23. March 2015

Social Democratic Party of Germany politicians
Gay politicians
LGBT mayors of places in Germany
Mayors of Wiesbaden
1974 births
Living people